Freakin' at the Freakers Ball is a studio album produced by Ron Haffkine written by Shel Silverstein originally released in 1972. The title track was covered by Dr. Hook & The Medicine Show on an album titled Sloppy Seconds.

The tracks "Sarah Cynthia Sylvia Stout Would Not Take the Garbage Out" and "The Peace Proposal" would later be released as poems in Silverstein's collection Where the Sidewalk Ends, with "The Peace Proposal" being retitled "The Generals".

Influence
According to country singer David Allan Coe, Freakin' at the Freakers Ball inspired him to record his own comedic music, and was encouraged by Shel Silverstein to record these songs, resulting in the controversial albums Nothing Sacred and Underground Album.

Track listing 
All tracks composed by Shel Silverstein; except where indicated

References

External links

Shel Silverstein albums
Columbia Records albums
1969 albums
Albums produced by Ron Haffkine